Robert Kantor may refer to:
Jacob Robert Kantor (1888–1984), American psychologist
Robert Kantor (sculptor) (born 1943), American lawyer and sculptor 
Robert Kántor (born 1977), Czech ice hockey defenceman